The Rail Splitter Wind Farm is a 67-turbine wind farm in northern Logan County and southern Tazewell County in the U.S. state of Illinois. The turbines are expected to generate a maximum of 100.5 megawatts of electricity. The wind farm is owned and operated by Horizon Wind Energy. The wind turbines that constitute the farm are centered on the town of Emden on both sides of Interstate 155. The wind farm, constructed in 2008–2009 at a cost of $200.0 million, was dedicated on July 21, 2009.

References

Energy infrastructure completed in 2009
Wind farms in Illinois
Buildings and structures in Logan County, Illinois
Buildings and structures in Tazewell County, Illinois